Deven Anthony Mitchell (born October 22, 1984) is an American basketball player for Dinamo București. Mitchell played three seasons collegiate for the Missouri State and played four seasons for CS Gaz Metan Mediaş in Romania.

Honours
  Austrian League MVP (1): 2009
  Romanian Cup (2): 2011, 2013

References

1984 births
Living people
American expatriate basketball people in Austria
American expatriate basketball people in France
American expatriate basketball people in Romania
American men's basketball players
Basketball players from St. Louis
Missouri State Bears basketball players
Small forwards
Traiskirchen Lions players